Merrill  is a locality in the Upper Lachlan Shire, New South Wales, Australia. It lies on Merrill Creek, to the west of the road from Gunning to Crookwell, about 15 km north of Gunning and 80 km north of Canberra.

Merrill Creek had a state school from 1877 to 1893. It was variously described as a "public", "provisional" or "half-time".

References

Upper Lachlan Shire
Localities in New South Wales
Southern Tablelands